The Deir Yassin massacre took place on April 9, 1948, when around 130 fighters from the Zionist paramilitary groups Irgun and Lehi killed at least 107 Palestinian Arabs, including women and children, in Deir Yassin, a village of roughly 600 people near Jerusalem, despite having earlier agreed to a peace pact. The assault occurred while Jewish militia sought to relieve the blockade of Jerusalem during the civil war that preceded the end of British rule in Palestine. 

The villagers put up stiffer resistance than the Jewish militias had expected and they suffered casualties. The village fell after house-to-house fighting. Some of the Palestinian Arabs were killed in the course of the battle, others while trying to flee or surrender. A number of prisoners were executed, some after being paraded in West Jerusalem, where they were jeered, spat at, stoned, and eventually executed. In addition to the killing and widespread looting, there may have been cases of mutilation and rape. Despite an original boast by the victors that 254 had been killed, modern scholarship puts the death toll at far fewer. Palestinian historian Aref al-Aref counted 117 victims, seven in combat and the rest in their homes. The number of wounded is estimated to between 12 and 50. Five of the attackers were killed and a dozen wounded.

The massacre was condemned by the leadership of the Haganah—the Jewish community's main paramilitary force—by the area's two chief rabbis and famous Jews abroad like Albert Einstein, Jessurun Cardozo, Hannah Arendt, Sidney Hook and others. The Jewish Agency for Palestine sent Jordan's King Abdullah a letter of apology, which he rebuffed. He held them responsible for the massacre, and warned about "terrible consequences" if similar incidents occurred elsewhere.

The massacre became a pivotal event in the Arab–Israeli conflict for its demographic and military consequences. The narrative was embellished and used by various parties to attack each other—by the Palestinians against Israel; by the Haganah to play down their own role in the affair; and by the Israeli left to accuse the Irgun and Lehi of blackening Israel's name by violating the Jewish principle of purity of arms. 

News of the killings sparked terror among Palestinians across the country, frightening them to flee their homes in the face of Jewish troop advances and it strengthened the resolve of Arab governments to intervene, which they did five weeks later. Four days after the Deir Yassin massacre, on April 13, a revenge attack on the Hadassah medical convoy in Jerusalem ended in a massacre killing 78 Jews, most of whom were the medical staff. Archival material in Israeli military deposits documenting the massacre remain classified.

Background

Political and military situation

The attack on Deir Yassin took place a few months after the United Nations had proposed that Palestine be divided into an Arab state and a Jewish one. The Arabs rejected the proposal, and civil war broke out.

In the months leading up to the end of British rule, in a phase of the civil war known as "The Battle of [the] Roads", the Arab League-sponsored Arab Liberation Army (ALA)—composed of Palestinians and other Arabs—attacked Jewish traffic on major roads in an effort to isolate the Jewish communities from each other. The ALA managed to seize several strategic vantage points along the highway between Jerusalem and Tel Aviv—Jerusalem's sole supply route and link to the western side of the city (where 16 percent of all Jews in Palestine lived)—and began firing on convoys traveling to the city. By March 1948, the road was cut off and Jerusalem was under siege. In response, the Haganah launched Operation Nachshon to break the siege. On April 6, in an effort to secure strategic positions, the Haganah and its strike force, the Palmach, attacked al-Qastal, a village two kilometers north of Deir Yassin overlooking the Jerusalem-Tel Aviv highway.

Irgun and Lehi militia

Most of the Jewish forces that attacked Deir Yassin belonged to two extremist, underground, militias, the Irgun (Etzel, abbreviated IZL) (National Military Organization), led by Menachem Begin, and the Lehi (Fighters for the Freedom of Israel, abbreviated LHI), also known as the Stern Gang, both aligned with the right-wing revisionist Zionist movement. Often referred to as "revisionists" (or "dissidents") because their ideological alignment contrasted with the Yishuv's (Jewish community in Palestine) dominant labor Zionist movement.

Formed in 1931, Irgun was a militant group that broke away from the mainstream Jewish militia, the Haganah. During the 1936–39 Arab revolt in Palestine, in which Palestinian Arabs rose up against the British mandate authorities in protest at Jewish mass immigration into the country, Irgun's tactics had included bus and marketplace bombings, condemned by both the British and the Jewish Agency. Lehi, an Irgun splinter group, was formed in 1940 following Irgun's decision to declare a truce with the British during World War II. Lehi subsequently carried out a series of assassinations designed to force the British out of Palestine. In April 1948, it was estimated that the Irgun had 300 fighters in Jerusalem, and Lehi around 100.

Both groups had committed numerous terror attacks against the British and the Arabs but Deir Yassin would be their first proper military operation and the groups were keen to show their rival the Haganah their combat prowess. It was also their first joint operation since the split in 1940.

Deir Yassin 

Deir Yassin was a Palestinian Arab village of several hundred residents, all Muslim, living in 144 houses. The International Committee of the Red Cross reported that there were 400 residents; Yoav Gelber writes that there were 610, citing the British mandatory authority figures; and Begin's biographer, Eric Silver, 800 to 1,000. The village was relatively prosperous, thanks to the excavation of limestone from its quarries, which allowed the residents to make a good living from stone-cutting.

The village was situated on a hill 800 meters above sea level and two kilometers south of the Tel Aviv highway. It bordered West Jerusalem's Jewish suburbs; Givat Shaul, an Orthodox community, just across the valley 700 meters to the northeast, and Beit HaKerem to the southeast. The closest Arab towns were Qalunya a few kilometers to the northwest and Ein Karem a few kilometers to the southwest, where the Arab Liberation Army had set up a base. Cutting through Ein Karem and Deir Yassin was the Sharafa ridge (Mount Herzl), a strategically important elevation that the Haganah had taken earlier. The only road to and from the village ran eastward passing through Givat Shaul.

By most accounts, the villagers lived in peace with their Jewish neighbors, particularly those in Givat Shaul, some of whom reportedly tried to help the villagers during the Irgun–Lehi massacre.

Peace pact 
On January 20, 1948, the villagers met leaders of the Givat Shaul community to form a peace pact. The Deir Yassin villagers agreed to inform Givat Shaul should Palestinian militiamen appear in the village, by hanging out certain types of laundry during the day—two white pieces with a black piece in the middle—and at night signaling three dots with a flashlight and placing three lanterns in a certain place. In return, patrols from Givat Shaul guaranteed safe passage to Deir Yassin residents, in vehicles or on foot, passing through their neighborhood on the way to Jerusalem. Yoma Ben-Sasson, Haganah commander in Givat Shaul, said after the village had been captured that, "there was not even one incident between Deir Yassin and the Jews." The view was echoed in a secret Haganah report which stated that the village had stayed "faithful allies of the western [Jerusalem] sector."

Gelber viewed it is unlikely that the peace pact between Deir Yassin and Givat Shaul continued to hold in April, given the intensity of hostilities between the Arab and Jewish communities elsewhere. On April 4, the Haganah affiliated daily Davar reported that "[t]he western neighborhoods of Jerusalem, Beit Hakerem and Bayit Vagan, was attacked on Sabbath night (April 2) by fire from the direction of Deir Yassin, Ein Kerem and Colonia." Over the next few days, the Jewish community at Motza and Jewish traffic on the road to Tel Aviv came under fire from the village. On April 8, Deir Yassin youth took part in the defence of the Arab village of al-Qastal, which the Jews had invaded days earlier: the names of several Deir Yassin residents appeared on a list of wounded compiled by the British Palestine police.

Arab militia 
Arab militiamen had tried to set up camp in the village, leading to a firefight that saw one villager killed. Just before January 28, Abd al-Qadir al-Husayni had arrived with 400 men and tried to recruit some villagers, but the elders voiced their opposition and the men moved on. The leader of the village, the mukhtar, was summoned to Jerusalem to explain to the Arab Higher Committee (AHC), the Palestinian Arab leadership, what the village's relationship was with the Jews: he told them the villagers and the Jews lived in peace. No steps were taken against him, and he was not asked to cancel the peace pact. On February 13, an armed gang of Arabs arrived to attack Givat Shaul, but the Deir Yassin villagers saw them off, the result of which was that the gang killed all the village's sheep. On March 16, the AHC sent a delegation to the village to request that it host a group of Iraqi and Syrian irregulars to guard it. The villagers said no then, and again on April 4, though Irgun fighters said they did encounter at least two foreign militiamen during the April 9 invasion.

Lapidot in his 1992 memoirs described occasional skirmishes between Deir Yassin and Givat Shaul residents, that on April 3, shots had been fired from Deir Yassin toward the Jewish villages of Bet Hakerem and Yefe Nof. He further stated that the village was defended by 100 armed men, that ditches had been dug around it, that Iraqi and Palestinian guerrillas were stationed there, and that there was a guard force stationed by the village entrance. Morris writes that it is possible some militiamen were stationed in the village, but the evidence is far from definitive, in his view. He also notes that Begin at the time didn't mention attacks from the village or the presence of foreign militiamen as he would do years later. Gelber writes that there is no evidence of militiamen in the village and finds no reason to believe that there were any.

Witnesses 
Due to the lack of technical evidence, historians' narratives of the Deir Yassin massacre are largely based on witness accounts. Either in the form of reports produced before or shortly after the attack, or in interviews conducted many years later. The following witnesses are main sources for historians:

 Haganah personnel
 Meir Pa'il, 22, intelligence officer with the Palmach, who spied on Irgun and Lehi. After the war he became a politician and historian.
 Mordechai Weg, known as Yaki or Yaacov, commander of Palmach's Harel 4th brigade. He died in combat a few weeks after Deir Yassin.
 Yitzhak Levi, head of the Shai in Jerusalem. He published his memoirs Nine Measures in 1986.
 Irgun fighters
 Mordechai Raanan, Irgun district commander in Jerusalem.
 Yehoshua Gorodenchik, Irgun physician whose testimony was given to the Jabotinsky archives following the war.
 Yehuda Lapidot, 19, Irgun commander, second-in-command in the attack on Deir Yassin. After the war he became an academic and in 1992 he published his memoir Besieged Jerusalem 1948: memories of an Irgun fighter.
 Lehi fighters
 Ezra Yachin.
 Survivors
 Fahimi Zeidan, a 12-year-old girl, testified in 1987.
 Mohamed Aref Samir, schoolteacher in Deir Yassin and later education official in Jordan.
 Others
 Jacques de Reynier, a Frenchman and head of the International Committee of the Red Cross delegation in Palestine who had been staying in the country since early April. He visited Deir Yassin on April 11 and reported what he saw on April 13.

Battle plans

Decision to attack

Irgun and Lehi commanders approached David Shaltiel, the Haganah commander in Jerusalem, for approval. He was initially reluctant, because the villagers had signed a non-aggression pact, and suggested attacking Ein Karem instead. The Lehi and Irgun commanders complained that this would be too hard for them. Shaltiel ultimately yielded, on condition that the attackers would continue to occupy the village rather than destroying it, lest its ruins be used by Arab militias which would force the Jews to reconquer it. His approval met with resistance. Pa'il objected to violating the peace pact with the village, but Shaltiel maintained that he had no power to stop them. Pa'il said in 1998 that Levi had proposed that the inhabitants be notified, but Shaltiel had refused to endanger the operation by warning them. David Siton of Lehi claimed he also protested because the village was docile:

According to Morris, it was agreed during planning meetings that the residents would be expelled. Lehi further proposed that any villagers who failed to flee should be killed to terrify the rest of the country's Arabs. According to the testimony of the commander of the operation, Ben-Zion Cohen, who was later to state that had there been '(t)hree or four more Deir Yassins,.. not a single Arab would have remained in the country,' most of the Irgun and Lehi fighters at preparatory meetings agreed the aim should be one of the "liquidation of all the men in the village and any other force that opposed us, whether it be old people, women, or children." According to Lapidot, the Irgun high command, including Menachem Begin, objected and the troops were specifically ordered not to kill women, children, or prisoners.

Lapidot in his memoirs claimed that, in the view of Irgun and Lehi, Deir Yassin posed a threat to Jewish neighborhoods and the main road to the coastal plain. He further claimed that an assault on the village would show the Arabs that the Jews intended to fight for Jerusalem. In earlier testimony he had claimed that "the reason was mainly economic ... to capture booty" to supply Irgun and Lehi's bases with.

Pre-attack briefing 

About 130 fighters participated in the attack of which 70 came from Irgun, according to Morris. Hogan estimates that there were 132 men; 72 from Irgun, 60 from Lehi, and some women serving in supporting roles. They met for briefings on April 8, a few hours before the attack began. Lehi would stage its attack from Givat Shaul, and the Irgun from Beit HaKerem. Lapidot writes that the mood at the Irgun meeting was festive. It was the first time a large number of underground fighters had met openly, and the collaboration between the groups increased their sense of solidarity. They chose a password to reflect the mood, "Ahdut Lohemet" ("Fighters' Solidarity"). This was the phrase that would signal the start of the attack.

According to Lapidot, Raanan stressed that women, children, and the elderly must not be harmed, and that the villagers were to be warned by loudspeaker to give them a chance to escape. The road to Ayn Karim would be left open so they could head there.

The scant arsenal was divided as follows. The Irgunists got one of the three Bren machine gun, Lehi got the other and the third was used for the loudspeaker vehicle. Each rifleman got 40 bullets, each person with a Sten gun 100 bullets, and each fighter two hand grenades. The stretcher bearers only got clubs. They had no communication equipment. Despite their confidence, the fighters, most of them teenagers, were by all accounts ill-prepared, untrained, and inexperienced.

Day of the attack

Invasion 

After the briefing, the fighters were driven to their assigned positions. The Irgun force approached Deir Yassin from the east and south, arriving at the edge of the village at about 4:30 AM. The Lehi force was supposed to be taking their positions around the village at the same time but were in fact late. The Irgun commanders had no way to contact them, and had to assume they were on schedule. Following the Lehi group were Pa'il and a photographer. He wanted to observe the revisionists' fighting capabilities. 

According to Ben-Zion Cohen, the fight erupted as his men took action when dogs started barking. At 04:45 a village sentry spotted the Irgunists moving in, and called out in Arabic, "Mahmoud". One of the Irgun fighters thought he had said "Ahdut", part of the password. He responded with the second half of the password, "Lohemet". According to an Irgun fighter, the Arabs shouted "Yahud" (Jews) and opened fire.

A gunbattle then broke out. The Irgun force came under fire from a three-man village guard in a concrete pillbox, and from houses in the village as residents scrambled for their rifles to join the battle, firing out of windows. The Irgun men replied with withering fire towards the pillbox and into the village.

When the Lehi force, which was late, finally arrived at the other end of the village to begin the attack, the fighting was already underway. The Lehi force was spearheaded by an armored vehicle with a loudspeaker. The plan was to drive the vehicle into the center of the village and blare a warning in Arabic, urging the residents to run towards Ein Karim. Instead, the vehicle halted or overturned at a ditch directly in front of the village, and as it struggled to get out, the Arabs opened fire on it. Whether a warning was read out on the loudspeaker is unknown. Yachin stated that it was: 

Abu Mahmoud, a survivor, told the BBC in 1998 that he did hear the warning. Aref Samir stated that he didn't hear the warning:
 
If a warning was read out it was obscured due to the sounds of heavy gunfire and few, if any, villagers heard it.

Irgun and Lehi commanders had believed the residents would flee, but the fighters encountered resistance. The residents did not realize that the point of the attack was conquest, thinking it was just a raid.   The villagers' sniper fire from higher positions in the west, especially from the mukhtar's house, effectively contained the attack. Some Lehi units went for help from the Haganah's Camp Schneller in Jerusalem. The men had no experience of attacking an Arab village in daylight, and lacked support weapons. Following an order from Benzion Cohen, the Irgun commander, they resorted to house-to-house attacks, throwing grenades into every house before charging in and spraying the rooms with automatic fire.

The Lehi forces slowly advanced, engaging in house-to-house fighting. In addition to Arab resistance, they also faced other problems; weapons failed to work, a few tossed hand grenades without pulling the pin, and a Lehi unit commander, Amos Kenan, was wounded by his own men. In an interview decades later, Yachin claimed "To take a house, you had either to throw a grenade or shoot your way into it. If you were foolish enough to open doors, you got shot down—sometimes by men dressed up as women, shooting out at you in a second of surprise." Meanwhile, the Irgun force on the other side of the village was also having a difficult time. It took about two hours of house-to-house fighting to reach the center of the village.

Irgun considers retreat 

By 7:00 a.m., as many as four attackers had been killed. Benzion Cohen, the top Irgun commander, was wounded in the leg. After being shot, he gave an order: 'there’s no woman, no man. [We’re] blowing up as many houses as possible, and killing anyone who shoots. Approach the building, lay the explosives, activate them, fall back, blow up the building with all its inhabitants after they’ve opened fire. Immediately after the explosion, we go, because they’re in shock, and the first thing is to [shoot] bursts right and left.' He was replaced by Lapidot. Irgun commander Yehuda Segal was shot in the stomach and later died. Irgun commanders relayed a message to the Lehi camp that they were considering retreating. Lehi commanders relayed back that they had already entered the village and expected victory soon.

Frustration over the lack of progress and Arab resistance was taken out on the prisoners which they began executing. Cohen reported that "we eliminated every Arab we came across up to that point." Yehuda Feder of Lehi a few days after the attack wrote that about machine gunning three Arab prisoners: "In the village I killed an armed Arab man and two Arab girls of 16 or 17 who were helping the Arab who was shooting. I stood them against a wall and blasted them with two rounds from the Tommy gun." Gorodenchik claimed that 80 prisoners were killed:

Aref Samir in 1981 stated:

Gelber writes that Gorodenchik's figure was inflated and has not been corroborated. Kan'ana write that 25 villagers were executed and thrown into the quarry after the battle, which Gelber regards as accurate. According to survivor testimony, as many as 33 civilians were executed in the morning.

The large number of Jewish wounded was a problem. Zalman Meret called the Magen David Adom station for an ambulance. The fighters took beds out of the houses, and doors off their hinges, laid the wounded on them, and ordered Arab women and old men to carry the injured to the ambulance in order to discourage Arab fire. According to Gorodenchik, the Arab stretcher bearers were nevertheless hit by fire. The ambulance left with some of the wounded at 8:00 am.

When the attackers ran low on ammunition, Lehi people went to Camp Schneller to request ammunition from the Haganah. Weg wasn't in the camp and his deputy Moshe Eren refused to make a decision. When Weg returned he gave them 3,000 bullets. They also asked for weapons which Weg refused them. Haganah squads also provided covering fire, firing on villagers fleeing south towards Ein Karem and preventing any Arab reinforcements from reaching the village.

Use of explosives 

The doors of the houses in Deir Yassin were made of iron and not wood, as the attackers had thought, and they had difficulty breaking into the houses. Lapidot sent word to Raanan, who was watching the progress from Givat Shaul, to send explosives. Soon afterward, Raanan and his aides appeared with knapsacks filled with TNT. The Irgun fighters were instructed to dynamite houses as they advanced. Under covering fire, the dynamite teams advanced and set charges to houses. In certain instances, the force of the explosions destroyed entire parts of houses, burying the Arabs inside them. A total of 15 houses were blown up.

Zeidan recalled hiding with her family and another when the door was blasted open. The attackers took them outside where they executed an already wounded man and one of his daughters. Two of her own family members were then killed: "Then they called my brother Mahmoud and shot him in our presence, and when my mother screamed and bent over my brother (she was carrying my little sister Khadra who was still being breastfed) they shot my mother too."

Whether houses were blown up or not is disputed. American historian Matthew Hogan claims that they weren't. He cites Pa'il who in his testimony said he was sure that "[n]o house in Deir Yassin was bombed" and independent visitors to the village, following its fall, who didn't mention structural damage. Among them Eliyahu Arbel, a Haganah operations officer, who recalled finding dead inside the houses but "with no signs of battle and not as a result of blowing up houses" and Irgunist Menachem Adler, who didn't participate in the attack, but visited the village a few days later, who said "I didn't see the destruction that is always recounted." Hogan believes that "it is unlikely that the inexperienced and undersupplied fighters under fire efficiently maneuvered explosives around defended houses." He further argues that if explosives were used, the number of wounded and dismembered bodies would have been much higher. Instead, Hogan claims that the explosives story were used by the perpetrators to explain the high number of deaths as the result of combat rather than as a deliberate massacre.

Palmach intervenes 

Some time later, two Palmach units arrived, commanded by Weg and Moshe Eren in two armored vehicles and carrying two two-inch mortars. Exactly when is unclear; Milstein writes "at noon," Hogan "about 10:00 am." Weg described the intervention in his report:

Pa'il said that it was Moshe Idelstein that asked Weg for help:
 
The mortar was fired three times at the mukhtar's house, which stopped the sniper fire. Reviewing the situation, Weg concluded that the wounded could not be evacuated before suppressing all hostile fire. Thus, his mission expanded to capturing the village.

According to one Palmach fighter, "six of us went house to house, throwing grenades and bursting in." Lehi officer David Gottlieb said the Palmach had accomplished "in one hour what we could not accomplish in several hours". The story is corroborated by Palmach fighter Kalman Rosenblatt who said "Together with six [other] people I went from house to house. We threw grenades into the houses before we entered them. We met the Lehi and Etzel [Irgun] people in the middle of the village. Some of them joined us. Others said ‘Until now, we fought, now you fight.’ In the houses there were dead. The dissidents did not fight." Hogan writes that Palmach's quick and injury free success and the small number of Irgun and Lehi casualties demonstrate that Deir Yassin's defenses were neither tough nor professional.

Cleanup 

Thanks to the rapid work of Palmach the fighting was over by about 11:00 am. Some villagers escaped and Jewish wounded were treated. At about 11:30 am Cohen was evacuated. Meanwhile, the Palmachniks and the revisionists went house to house to "clean up" and secure them. Pa'il met Weg and urged him to get out of Deir Yassin: "get away from here! Don't get mixed up with the Irgun and Stern Gang [Lehi]." The Palmach unit withdrew to Camp Schneller soon thereafter. Pa'il regretted asking Weg to leave: "To this very day I am haunted by the mistake I made. I shouldn’t have let Yaki and his men leave, but I didn’t imagine there was going to be a massacre there. If those Palmach guys had stayed, the dissidents wouldn’t have dared to commit a massacre. If we saw that, we would have cocked our guns and told them to stop."

In 1972, Raanan told a journalist that his men had found the house were Segal had fallen. Nine people in a nearby house that the attackers intended to blow open surrendered, including a woman and a child. The person with the Bren machine gun, shouted "This is for Yiftah [Segal's nom de guerre]!" and gunned them down. Yisrael Natach was a member of the Shai and were on the day stationed in Ein Karem. He heard stories from the arriving villagers that fled Deir Yassin that one Arab fighter had disguised himself as a woman which triggered the attackers' rage:

Pa'il recalled hearing the shooting start anew:

Mohammed Jabar, a boy at the time, remembered hiding under a bed and observing the attackers "break in, drive everybody outside, put them against the wall and shot them." He claimed one of the victims was a mother with her baby. Zeinab Akkel claimed she offered her life savings to an attacker in exchange for sparing her younger brothers life: "my husband had given me $400. I offered it ... and said, 'Please leave my brother alone, he is so young.'" He took the money "and shot him in the head with five bullets." Zeidan, who was taken prisoner, recalled meeting another group of captives: "We walked with some other women from the village, then came across a young man and an older man, with their hands up in the air, under guard." "When they reached us, the soldiers shot them." The young man's mother was in Zeidan's group and she started hitting the fighters that killed her son, so "one of them stabbed her with a knife a few times."

Houses and corpses were pillaged and money and jewelry were stolen from prisoners. Shaltiel got reports on what was happening in Deir Yassin and sent Gichon there to convince the revisionists to stop the massacre. The revisionists were initially reluctant to let him enter:

Gichon told them "not to throw the bodies into cisterns and caves, because that was the first place that would be checked." He described beatings, looting, and the stripping of jewelry and money from prisoners. He wrote that the initial orders were to take the men prisoner and send the women and children away, but the order was changed to kill all the prisoners. The mukhtar's son was killed in front of his mother and sisters, he said. The most detailed report comes from Pa'il who spied on the revisionists on behalf of the Haganah:

Pa'il writes that the Haredi people of Givat Shaul came to help the villagers at around 2 p.m., and were able to stop the killing:

Pa'il went home and wrote a report about what he had seen while his photographer developed the negatives. The next day he submitted his report.

Morris writes that the killing continued after April 9. Some villagers who had either hidden or pretended to be dead were apparently killed by Lehi men on April 10 or 11.

Trucking and parading of prisoners 

During the day, prisoners were loaded into trucks that came to and departed from Deir Yassin. Some were paraded through the streets of West Jerusalem, where they were jeered, spat at, and stoned, some were released in East Jerusalem and some were returned to Deir Yassin where they were executed. Harry Levin, a Haganah broadcaster, reported seeing "three trucks driving slowly up and down King George V Avenue bearing men, women, and children, their hands above their heads, guarded by Jews armed with sten-guns and rifles." Haganah intelligence officer Mordechai Gichon wrote on April 10:

Pa'il reported that he saw five Arab men being paraded through the streets, and later saw their bodies in a quarry near Givat Shaul. Morris writes that this is supported by two Jewish doctors who visited Deir Yassin on April 12 and reported that they found five male bodies in a house by the village quarry.

Fifty-five children from the village whose parents had been killed were taken to the Jaffa Gate in Jerusalem's Old City, and left there. They were found by a Palestinian woman, Hind Husseini, a member of the prominent Palestinian Husseini family. She at first rented two rooms for them, bringing them food every day, before moving them to the Sahyoun convent. In July, she moved them again, this time to her family home, a large house her grandfather had built in Jerusalem in 1891. She renamed the house Dar Al-Tifl Al-Arabi (Arab Children's House), and set up a foundation to finance it. The orphanage continues to this day.

A Shai report from April 12 to Shaltiel read: "Some of the women and children were taken prisoner by the Lehi and transferred to Sheik Bader [Lehi's headquarter in Jerusalem]. Among the prisoners were a young woman and a baby. The camp guards killed the baby before the mother’s eyes. After she fainted they killed her too." Seven old men and women, who had been taken to Jerusalem, were taken back to Deir Yassin and killed in the quarry there, he wrote, and an Arab man, believed to be a sniper, was killed and his corpse burned in front of foreign journalists.

Irgun–Lehi press conference 

On the evening of April 9, the fighters invited American journalists to a house in Givat Shaul, where they served tea and cookies while explaining the attacks. A spokesman said he regretted the casualties among the women and children, but they were inevitable because every house had to be reduced by force. Ten houses had been blown up entirely, he said, though historians doubt if that was true. Other houses had their doors blown off and hand grenades thrown inside.

The day after 

At a news conference on April 10, Raanan untruthfully told reporters on April 10 that 254 Arab bodies had been counted. The figure was repeated by the BBC and the Hebrew news services by The New York Times on April 13.

Eliahu Arbel, Operations Officer B of the Haganah's Etzioni Brigade, visited Deir Yassin on April 10. "I have seen a great deal of war," he said years later, "but I never saw a sight like Deir Yassin."

The Arab side told de Reynier about the massacre in Deir Yassin and asked him to investigate. He was discouraged from visiting the village by Haganah and the Jewish Agency but insisted on going: "They advised me not to interfere, because if I were to go there, my mission might be ended. They washed their hands in advance of anything that might happen to me if I insisted. I answered that I would fulfill my duty and that I saw the Jewish Agency as directly responsible for my safety and freedom of action, because it is responsible for all territories under Jewish control."

April 11 
Morning April 11 de Reynier visited Deir Yassin. He reported that he had encountered a "cleaning-up team" when he arrived the village:

In his memoirs, published in 1950, de Reynier wrote: 

He also wrote that some of the 150 cadavers had been decapitated and disemboweled. After his inspection, the Irgun asked him to sign a document to say he had been received courteously and thanking them for their help. When he refused, they told him he would sign it if he valued his life. "The only course open to me was to convince them that I did not value my life in the least," he wrote. His assistant, Dr. Alfred Engel, wrote:

April 12 
On April 12 before noon, two Jewish doctors, Tzvi Avigdori, the chairman of the Jerusalem branch of the Palestine Physicians Association, and his deputy, A. Druyan, visited Deir Yassin and reported:

Later the same day, troops from Haganah's youth organization Gadna were ordered to the village. They were to relieve of the revisionists but not before they had disposed of the bodies, something they had refused to do. The dispute almost lead to violence. Yeshurun Schiff who had accompanied the Gadna troops recalled: "I told the commander [of Etzel or Lehi], 'you are swine.' My people surrounded them. I spoke to Shaltiel by wireless. Shaltiel said, 'Take their weapons, and if they do not surrender their weapons, open fire.' I said, 'I cannot do that to Jews.' Shaltiel said 'That’s an order!' but then he changed his mind." Eventually the revisionists left and the Gadna troops buried the bodies.

Gadna counsellor Hillel Polity related: "The stench was awful. They brought us gloves from the city, windbreakers and kerchiefs to cover our faces. We transported the bodies, two at a time, by hand, to the quarry. A bulldozer was brought from the city and used to cover the bodies with earth." Gadna commander Shoshana Shatai claimed she saw a woman with a great smashed belly: "I was in shock. On the following day I told the investigator what I had seen."

Casualties

Number of Arabs killed 

For many decades the number of victims were believed to be around 250, based on Raanan's false estimate. Modern scholarship puts the number at about half that. Sharif Kan'ana of Bir Zeit University interviewed survivors and published figures in 1988; 107 villagers had died, 11 of them armed, with 12 wounded. Israeli researcher Eliezer Tauber writes that a total of 101 people were killed, 61 definitely in combat circumstances (including 24 armed fighters, with the remainder being their family members who were with them); 18 for whom the cause of death could not be determined; about 10 whose deaths are in a "grey zone" whose charactization can be debated; and a further 11 being members of a single family who were gunned down by a single Irgun member.

Number of attackers killed and injured 
Yehuda Slutzky, a former Haganah officer, wrote in 1972 that four attackers were killed and 32 wounded, four of them seriously. Hogan in 2001 based on an Irgun communique from 11 April, put the death toll at five, four of whom were killed during the battle and one who later died of wounds sustained there. In addition, he wrote that four attackers were seriously wounded and 28 were "lightly wounded." Gelber in 2006 put the casualty toll of the attackers at five killed and 35 wounded. Morris, also in 2006, put the number of casualties at four killed and a dozen seriously wounded, adding that the figures of 30 to 40 wounded given by the attackers were likely exaggerated.

Reaction

Appeals to the British
The Arab emergency committee in Jerusalem learned of the attack around nine in the morning of April 9, including reports about the killing of women and children. They requested the help of the British, but did nothing further. In the late afternoon, they started to hear reports of women and children being paraded through the streets of Jerusalem. They sent the prisoners food and again appealed to the British army to intervene, to no avail. Gelber writes that the British were not keen to take on the Irgun and Lehi, who would have fought back if attacked, unlike the Haganah. High Commissioner Sir Alan Cunningham urged that troops be sent to Deir Yassin, but Lieutenant General Sir Gordon MacMillan, General Officer Commanding (GOC) of the British Forces in Palestine and Trans-Jordan, said he would risk British lives only for British interests. The RAF commanding officer offered to fire rockets on the Jewish forces in the village, but the light bombers had been sent to Egypt and the rockets to Iraq. Cunningham later said the RAF had brought a squadron of Tempest aircraft from Iraq to bomb the village, but he cancelled the operation when he learned the Haganah had arrived there and had garrisoned it.

Praise 
Begin hailed the taking of Deir Yassin as a “splendid act of conquest" that would serve as a model for the future: in a note to his commanders he wrote: 'Tell the soldiers: you have made history in Israel with your attack and your conquest. Continue thus until victory. As in Deir Yassin, so everywhere, we will attack and smite the enemy. God, God, Thou has chosen us for conquest.'

Propaganda
The Jordanian newspaper Al Urdun published a survivor's account in 1955, which said the Palestinians had deliberately exaggerated stories about atrocities in Deir Yassin to encourage others to fight, stories that had caused them to flee instead. Every group in Palestine had cause for spreading the atrocity narrative. The Irgun and Lehi wished to frighten the Arabs into leaving Palestine; the Arabs wished to provoke an international response; the Haganah wished to tarnish the Irgun and Lehi; and the Arabs wished to malign both the Jews and their cause. In addition, Milstein writes, the left-wing Mapai party and David Ben-Gurion, who became Israel's first prime minister on May 14, exploited Deir Yassin to stop a power-sharing agreement with the right-wing Revisionists—who were associated with Irgun and Lehi—a proposal that was being debated at the time in Tel Aviv.

Hazem Nuseibeh, the news editor of the Palestine Broadcasting Service at the time of the attack, gave an interview to the BBC in 1998. He spoke about a discussion he had with Hussayn Khalidi, the deputy chairman of the Higher Arab Executive in Jerusalem, shortly after the killings: "I asked Dr. Khalidi how we should cover the story. He said, 'We must make the most of this.' So he wrote a press release, stating that at Deir Yassin, children were murdered, pregnant women were raped, all sorts of atrocities." Gelber writes that Khalidi told journalists on April 12 that the village's dead included 25 pregnant women, 52 mothers of babies, and 60 girls.

Allegations of sexual violence 
A number of sources alleged there had been instances of rape. Levi wrote on April 13: "LHI members tell of the barbaric behavior of the IZL toward the prisoners and the dead. They also relate that the IZL men raped a number of Arab girls and murdered them afterward (we don't know if this is true)"  Another source of rape allegations was Assistant Inspector-General Richard Catling of the British Palestine Police Force. He led a British police team that conducted interviews with survivors in Silwan on April 13, 15 and 16:

Gelber suggests that either the women's testimonies were a result of "the Arab propaganda machine" or that Catling was "an old and bitter enemy" of the Irgun and Lehi and fabricated the reports. The whereabouts of Catling's original reports are unknown, according to Gelber.

Gelber writes that the stories of rape angered the villagers, who complained to the Arab emergency committee that it was "sacrificing their honour and good name for propaganda purposes." Abu Mahmud, who lived in Deir Yassin in 1948, was one of those who complained. He told the BBC: "We said, 'There was no rape.' He [Hussayn Khalidi] said, 'We have to say this so the Arab armies will come to liberate Palestine from the Jews. "This was our biggest mistake," said Nusseibeh. "We did not realize how our people would react. As soon as they heard that women had been raped at Deir Yassin, Palestinians fled in terror. They ran away from all our villages." He told Larry Collins in 1968: "We committed a fatal error, and set the stage for the refugee problem."

A villager known as Haj Ayish claimed that "there had been no rape." He questioned the accuracy of the Arab radio broadcasts that "talked of women being killed and raped", and instead believed that "most of those who were killed were among the fighters and the women and children who helped the fighters." Mohammed Radwan, one of the villagers who fought the attackers, said: "There were no rapes. It's all lies. There were no pregnant women who were slit open. It was propaganda that ... Arabs put out so Arab armies would invade. They ended up expelling people from all of Palestine on the rumor of Deir Yassin." Radwan added "I know when I speak that God is up there and God knows the truth and God will not forgive the liars."

Historian Abdel Jawad states that women at Deir Yassin spoke to British interrogators about rapes occurring and their opinion that this was the worst thing that happened. He states that it was something that could not be discussed in their society and was never talked of by the men. Citing Hasso (2000:495) Isabelle Humphries and Laleh Khalili note that in Palestine men's honour was tied to "the maintenance of kin women's virginity (when unmarried) or exclusive sexual availability (when married)", and that this culture led to the suppression of the narratives of rape victims. Hogan cites one documentary in which one female survivor nods affirmatively when asked about "molestation."

Denying the massacre 
In 1969, the Israeli Foreign Ministry published an English pamphlet "Background Notes on Current Themes: Deir Yassin" denying that there had been a massacre at Deir Yassin, that the village was the home of an Iraqi garrison, and calling the massacre story "part of a package of fairy tales, for export and home consumption". The pamphlet led to a series of derivative articles giving the same message, mostly outside Israel. Menachem Begin's Herut party disseminated a Hebrew translation in Israel, causing a widespread but largely non-public debate within the Israeli establishment. Several former leaders of the Haganah demanded that the pamphlet be withdrawn on account of its inaccuracy, but the Foreign Ministry explained that "While our intention and desire is to maintain accuracy in our information, we sometimes are forced to deviate from this principle when we have no choice or alternative means to rebuff a propaganda assault or Arab psychological warfare." Levi wrote to Begin: "On behalf of the truth and the purity of arms of the Jewish soldier in the War of Independence, I see it as my duty to warn you against continuing to spread this untrue version about what happened in Deir Yassin to the Israeli public. Otherwise there will be no avoiding raising the matter publicly and you will be responsible." Eventually, the Foreign Ministry agreed to stop distributing the pamphlet, but it remains the source of many popular accounts.

Meir Pa'il testimony 
Israeli military historian Uri Milstein alleged in 1998 that Pa'il was not in Deir Yassin on April 9. Milstein said there were contradictions in Pa'il's claims and an absence of any mention of Pa'il in other Haganah accounts of the incident. All Irgun and Lehi veterans Milstein interviewed denied having seen Pa'il in Deir Yassin, and the Lehi intelligence officer who Pa'il claimed invited him to Deir Yassin denied having done so. In addition, Haganah members who were in the area (including the deputy commander of the Palmach force that took part in the attack), some of whom personally knew Pa'il and were specifically mentioned in his account, denied having seen him there. According to Milstein, Pa'il said he despised the "dissidents", thus giving him a political motive to submit a falsified report. Milstein also wrote that Haganah intelligence reports on the incident were doctored by the authors or their superiors to discredit the Irgun and Lehi because of political in-fighting within the Jewish community.

Morris challenges Milstein's version that Pa'il was not at Deir Yassin that day with his observation that part of Pa’il’s report, that he saw the bodies of five Arabs in a quarry, "is apparently reinforced by a report by two Jewish doctors, who also report having found five male bodies in a house by the village quarry". In a presentation to the PEACE Middle East Dialog Group, Ami Isseroff, translator of Milstein's book into English, provided side-notes critical of many aspects of Milstein's work, including much of his information about Pa'il and also about the incompleteness of his sources – "Both Milstein and Yitzhak Levi leave out key testimony by Yehoshua Gorodenchik, from the Jabotinsky archives, in which he admits that Irgun troops murdered about 80 prisoners – mostly men – corresponding to accounts of refugees."

Pa'il, who died in 2015, defended himself in an interview in 2007: "What the Lehi and Etzel [Irgun] people did in Deir Yassin in April 1948 was a despicable act. It cannot be called by any other name." He maintained that he was sent to Deir Yassin to gauge Lehi and Irgun's fighting capabilities which he found to be lacking: "they didn't know a thing about field war. Worse, I saw that they knew how to massacre and kill... They are angry with me that I said these things. Let them first be angry at themselves." He also attacked Milstein for being "a cheap propagandist for the right-wing considerations of the Zionist enterprise," adding angrily: "I was there, I saw the massacre with my own eyes. Why didn't he ever question me about the things I experienced there?"

Exodus and invasion

Maxime Rodinson argued that the massacre at Deir Yassin, and the fear of further terrorism that it inspired in the Palestinian population, was a major cause of the subsequent Palestinian flight. Mapam's leaders later concluded that the fall of Deir Yassin and Haifa were the two pivotal events of the Palestinian exodus. On April 14, Irgun radio broadcast that villages around Deir Yassin and elsewhere were being evacuated. HIS intelligence reported that the residents of Beit Iksa and Al Maliha had fled. The village of Fureidis appealed for arms. The villages of Fajja and Mansura reached a peace agreement with their Jewish neighbors. Arabs fled from Haifa and Khirbet Azzun. A Haganah attack on Saris encountered no resistance, because of the fear of Deir Yassin, in the view of the British. Menachem Begin, leader of the Irgun at the time of the attack, though not present at the village, wrote in 1977:

The Deir Yassin attack, along with attacks on Tiberias, Haifa, and Jaffa, put pressure on Arab governments to invade Palestine. News of the killings had aroused public anger in the Arab world, which the governments felt unable to ignore. Syria's foreign minister remarked that the Arab public's desire for war was irresistible. The arrival of tens of thousands of refugees further convinced them to act. A consensus favoring invasion began to emerge the day after Deir Yassin, at a meeting on April 10 in Cairo of the Arab League Political Committee. Golda Meir, disguised in an Arab robe, met king Abdullah in Amman on May 10–11, the second such meeting between them. During their first, Abdullah had agreed to a partition of Palestine to include a Jewish state. Now, he retracted, suggesting instead a Jewish canton within a Hashemite kingdom. Deir Yassin had changed things, he said. Meir reported later that Abdullah was approaching war "as a person who is in a trap and can't get out". The Arab invasion began at midnight on May 14, when Abdullah fired a symbolic shot in the air, and shouted "Forward!"

Aftermath

Deir Yassin today 

In 1949, despite protests, the Jerusalem neighborhood of Givat Shaul Bet was built on what had been Deir Yassin's land, now considered part of Har Nof, an Orthodox area. Four Jewish scholars, Martin Buber, Ernst Simon, Werner Senator, and Cecil Roth, wrote to Israel's first prime minister, David Ben-Gurion, asking that Deir Yassin be left uninhabited, or that its settlement be postponed. They wrote that it had become "infamous throughout the Jewish world, the Arab world and the whole world". Settling the land so soon after the killings would amount to an endorsement of them. Ben-Gurion failed to respond, though the correspondents sent him copy after copy. Eventually, his secretary replied that he had been too busy to read their letter.

In 1951, the Kfar Shaul Mental Health Center was built on the village itself, using some of the village's abandoned buildings. Currently, many of the remaining buildings, located within the hospital, are hidden behind the hospital's fence, with entry closely restricted. In the 1980s, most of the remaining abandoned parts of the village were bulldozed to make way for new neighborhoods, and most of the Deir Yassin cemetery was bulldozed to make way for a highway. Har HaMenuchot, a Jewish cemetery, lies to the north. To the south is a valley containing part of the Jerusalem Forest, and on the other side of the valley, a mile and a half away, lie Mount Herzl and the Holocaust memorial museum, Yad Vashem. Palestinian historian Walid Khalidi wrote in 1992:

Veterans benefits suit 
In 1952 a group of four wounded Irgun and Lehi fighters applied to the Israeli Defense Ministry for veterans' benefits. The Ministry rejected their application stating that the Deir Yassin massacre wasn't "military service". But the decision was reversed after the group appealed.

Archival records 
Archival records about the Deir Yassin massacre are believed to exist in sealed Israeli archives from the war. Among them, an eyewitness report from Pa'il and two rolls of photographs taken by the photographer who accompanied him. In 1999, the organization Deir Yassin Remembered asked Prime Minister Ehud Barak to release the records. In 2010, the Supreme Court of Israel rejected a petition by the newspaper Haaretz for the declassification of documents, reports and photographs concerning the Deir Yassin massacre. The court cited the possible damage to Israel's foreign relations and its negotiations with the Palestinians. This view was reaffirmed when Israeli researcher Rona Sela attempted to examine the material in the mid-2010s. The Israeli state archivist replied that:-
'A special committee (headed by the Minister of Justice Ayelet Shaked) to deal with permission to view classified archival material met on 11 September 2016, to discuss among others, your request. The committee asked for clarifications from additional sources and concluded that until they receive these answers and have further discussions on the subject, the material will remain classified.'

See also
Al-Dawayima massacre
Blood Libel at Deir Yassin: The Black Book
Hadassah medical convoy massacre
Kfar Etzion massacre
Killings and massacres during the 1948 Palestine War
Depopulated Palestinian locations in Israel
List of killings and massacres in Mandatory Palestine

Footnotes

Notes

References

BBC and PBS (1998). "The Arab Israeli Conflict – part 2 : Israeli massacres 1948", The Fifty Years War, accessed August 12, 2010.
 Begin, Menachem (1977): The Revolt. Dell Publishing.
 Collins, Larry and Lapierre, Dominique (1972): O Jerusalem!, Simon and Schuster.
 
Ellis, Marc H. (1999). O, Jerusalem!: the contested future of the Jewish covenant. Fortress Press. , 978-0-8006-3159-8
Gelber, Yoav (2006). Palestine 1948. "Propaganda as History: What Happened at Deir Yassin?" . Sussex Academic Press.
Hirst, David (2003). The Gun and the Olive Branch. Faber and Faber (first published 1977).
Holmes, Paul (1998) for Reuters, published in the Middle East Times, April 20, 1998, cited in Comay, Naomi. Arabs speak frankly on the Arab-Israeli conflict. Printing Miracles Limited, 2005, p. 16.

Kananah, Sharif and Zaytuni, Nihad (1988). Deir Yassin  (Destroyed Palestinian Villages), Birzeit University Press.

Lapidot, Yehuda (1992). Besieged, Jerusalem 1948: Memories of an Irgun Fighter. See part II, Jerusalem, for the section on Deir Yassin.
 

Meltzer, Julian Louis (1948). "Jerusalem truce halts Israeli push to retake old city", The New York Times, July 18, 1948.
McGowan, Daniel and Ellis, Marc. (eds.) (1998). Remembering Deir Yassin: The Future of Israel and Palestine. Interlink Publishing Group.
 
 
 
 
 

Pa'il, Meir and Isseroff, Ami (1998). "Meir Pail's Eyewitness Account", October 1, 1998, accessed November 18, 2010.

Rodinson, Maxime (1968). Israel and the Arabs, Penguin Books
Schmidt, Dana Adams (1948). 200 Arabs killed, stronghold taken, The New York Times, April 9, 1948.

Silver, Eric (1998). Arab witnesses admit exaggerating Deir Yassin massacre, The Jerusalem Report, April 2, 1998, accessed June 11, 2009.

Further reading

Al Hayat, April 1998. Articles to commemorate the 50th anniversary (Arabic): April 9, April 9, April 12, April 13, April 14, April 15, accessed April 15, 2011.
Al-Arif, Arif (1956). Al-Nakba. Beirut.
Avner, Yehuda. "The Ghosts of Deir Yassin", The Jerusalem Post, April 7, 2007.
Deir Yassin Remembered. "Deir Yassin Remembered", video showing scenes of the village remains and its cemetery, accessed April 15, 2011.
Hasso, Frances S. (2000). "Modernity and Gender in Arab Accounts of the 1948 and 1967 Defeats", International Journal of Middle East Studies, 32:491–510.
Lapidot, Yehuda. "Deir Yassin", IZL (Irgun) website, accessed April 15, 2011.
Laurens, Henry (2007). La Question de Palestine, vol.3, Fayard, Paris.
Lockman, Zachary (1996). Comrades and Enemies; Arab and Jewish Workers in Palestine, 1906 – 1948 University of California Press.
Masalha, Nur (1988). "On Recent Hebrew and Israeli Sources for the Palestinian Exodus, 1947–49", Journal of Palestine Studies, Vol. 18, No. 1, Special Issue: Palestine 1948 Autumn, 1988), pp. 121–137.
Milstein, Uri (2007). Blood Libel at Deir Yassin: The Black Book. National Midrasha Publishers and Survival Institute Publishers.
Milstein, Uri (1989)  (History of the War of Independence), Zemorah, Bitan. OCLC 21330115
Milstein, Uri (2012). The Birth of a Palestinian Nation: The Myth of the Deir Yassin Massacre Gefen Publishing House. 
Tal, Yerech. "There was no massacre there", Haaretz, September 8, 1991, page B3.
Rubinstein, Danny, "Indeed there was a massacre there", Haaretz, September 11, 1991.
Zionist Organization of America. Deir Yassin: History of a Lie, March 9, 1998; also see here, accessed April 15, 2011.
Zochrot. "Remembering Deir Yassin", YouTube, 2006, accessed April 15, 2011.
Zogby, James. "Remembering Deir Yassin", originally appeared in Al-Ahram Weekly, accessed June 26, 2016.

External links
DeirYassin.org Deir Yassin Remembered
Deir Yassin: My Memories, by  Najaf Hirbawi, 1998, The Palestine-Israel Journal 

1948 in Mandatory Palestine
Irgun
Lehi (militant group)
Massacres in Mandatory Palestine
Terrorism in Mandatory Palestine
Terrorist incidents in 1948
Zionist terrorism
Ethnic cleansing in Asia
April 1948 events in Asia
Terrorist incidents in Asia in 1948
1948 massacres of Palestinians
1948 murders in Asia